The 2000 Indiana Fever season was their 1st season in the Women's National Basketball Association (WNBA).

Offseason

Expansion Draft

WNBA Draft

Trades

Regular season

Season standings

Season schedule

Player stats

References

Fever on Basketball Reference

Indiana Fever
Indiana Fever seasons
Indiana